Inchture railway station served the village of Inchture, Perth and Kinross, Scotland from 1847 to 1956 on the Dundee and Perth Railway.

History 
The station opened on 24 May 1847 by the Dundee and Perth Railway.  A passenger tramway served Inchture Village to the north. The trams and the tramway started from one of the tramways in the station's good yard. The station closed to both passengers and goods traffic on 11 June 1956.

References

External links 

Disused railway stations in Perth and Kinross
Former Caledonian Railway stations
Railway stations in Great Britain opened in 1847
Railway stations in Great Britain closed in 1956
1847 establishments in Scotland
1956 disestablishments in Scotland